David or Dave Robertson may refer to:

Politics
David Robertson (Canadian politician) (1841–1912), former MPP
David Robertson (British politician) (1890–1970), British politician; former conservative MP for Streatham and Caithness and Sutherland
David Robertson, 1st Baron Marjoribanks (1797–1873), Scottish stockbroker and politician
David B. Robertson, Michigan state senator
Dave Robertson (Massachusetts politician), state representative

Sports
David Robertson (footballer, born 1900) (1900–1985), Scottish-American association footballer for Kilmarnock, Queen of the South, Brooklyn Wanderers, Bethlehem Steel & U.S. national team
David Robertson (footballer, born 1906) (1906–?), Scottish footballer with York City
David Robertson (footballer, born 1968), Scottish footballer with Aberdeen, Rangers and Scotland national team
David Robertson (footballer, born 1986), Scottish footballer with Dundee United, St Johnstone and Cowdenbeath
David Robertson (Australian footballer) (born 1962), Collingwood and Essendon player
David Robertson (sportsman) (1869–1937), Scottish bronze medallist in golf at the 1900 Summer Olympics and rugby union international
David Robertson (cricketer) (born 1959), Australian cricketer
David Robertson (cyclist) (1883–1963), British Olympic cyclist
David Robertson (baseball) (born 1985), Major League Baseball player
Dave Robertson (baseball) (1889–1970), baseball player
Dave Robertson (football manager) (born 1973), football manager and coach

Other
David Robertson (naturalist) (1806–1896), founder of Millport Marine Biological Station
David Robertson (1764–1845), British Army officer, also known as David Robertson MacDonald
David Robertson (1817–1910), Royal Navy officer, also known as David Robertson-Macdonald
David Robertson (architect) (1834–1925), Scottish architect
David Robertson (broadcaster) (born 1965), British journalist and newsreader for BBC Scotland
David Robertson (conductor) (born 1958), American conductor; music director of the St. Louis Symphony and the Sydney Symphony Orchestra
David Robertson (minister) (born 1962), Scottish minister and author
David Robertson (writer) (born 1977), Canadian graphic novelist and writer
David Allan Robertson (1880–1961), American academic and college administrator
David C. Robertson (born 1960), American computer scientist and organizational theorist
David Robertson (engineer) (1875–1941), professor of electrical engineering
Dave Robertson (political scientist), American political scientist